Seligman Airport  is a public use airport located  northwest of the central business district of Seligman, Arizona, United States, a census designated place located in Yavapai County. The airport has been owned by Yavapai County since 1985, and was leased by the county prior to then.

Facilities and aircraft 

It has one runway designated 04/22 with an asphalt surface measuring 4,800 by 75 feet (1463 x 22 m).

For the 12-month period ending April 14, 2016, the airport had 1,300 aircraft operations: 100% general aviation. In December 2017, there were two aircraft based at the airport.

References

External links 
 

Airports in Yavapai County, Arizona